The following is a list of episodes from the series Hanazuki: Full of Treasures.

Series overview

Episodes

Season 1 (2017)

Season 2 (2019)
A second season was announced on May 9, 2017, and first aired in 2018 on Carousel in Russia. It first aired in English on POP in late 2018 Season 2 premiered on Discovery Family in America on March 23, 2019, and ended on May 4, 2019. It was planned to run for 16 episodes, but it was cut down to 8 episodes.

Potential future
A third season was announced on August 3, 2017 during investor day and is currently in development.
As of 2022, the series is put on a hiatus, due to Titmouse ending production and leaving only eight more Season 2 episodes and fifteen more shorts remaining in the works, in order for Hasbro to find another studio to do the animation.

Shorts
On August 7, 2017, it was announced that Hasbro was preparing a series of 1- to 2-minute-long shorts that would be released between the first and second seasons. Eight shorts were released on June 16, 2018 in the United Kingdom via the Pop Fun mobile app.

References

Hanazuki: Full of Treasures